Klesnik may refer to the following places in Poland:
Kleśnik, Pomeranian Voivodeship
Klęśnik, Greater Poland Voivodeship